The 2018–19 Western Illinois Leathernecks women's basketball represent Western Illinois University in the 2018–19 NCAA Division I women's basketball season. The Leathernecks, led by eighth-year head coach JD Gravina, play their home games at the Western Hall and were members of The Summit League. They finished the season 12–18, 8–8 in Summit League play to finish in fifth place. They lost in the quarterfinals of the Summit League women's tournament to Oral Roberts.

Roster

Schedule

|-
!colspan=9 style=| Exhibition

|-
!colspan=9 style=| Non-conference regular season

|-
!colspan=9 style=| Summit League regular season

|-
!colspan=9 style=| Summit League Women's Tournament

See also
2018–19 Western Illinois Leathernecks men's basketball team

References

Western Illinois Leathernecks women's basketball seasons
Western Illinois
Sum
Sum